Bishop Radoslaw Zmitrowicz, O.M.I. (born 2 September 1962 in Wrzeszcz, Gdańsk, Poland) is a Polish-born Ukrainian Roman Catholic prelate, who serves as an Auxiliary bishop of the Roman Catholic Diocese of Kamyanets-Podilskyi and the Titular Bishop of Gypsaria since 21 October 2006.

Life
Bishop Zmitrowicz was born in the Roman-Catholic family in the suburb of Gdańsk. After graduation from the school and lyceum education, he joined the Missionary Oblates of Mary Immaculate in 1981; he made a solemn profession on May 21, 1987, and was ordained as priest on June 17, 1989, after graduation from the Major Missionary Oblates Theological Seminary in Obra, Poland, and Theological faculty of the Adam Mickiewicz University in Poznań, Poland.

After his ordination he served in the different Missionary Oblates institutions in Poland from 1989 until 1997, when he was transferred to Turkmenistan in the newly created Mission sui iuris of Turkmenistan. After 2000 he worked in Ukraine. Fr. Zmitrowicz served in the Missionary Oblates parishes in Chernihiv, Slavutych and Kyiv, until 2006, when he was appointed as a Superior of the Delegature of Missionary Oblates of Mary Immaculate in Ukraine.

On November 29, 2012, he was appointed by the Pope Benedict XVI as the Auxiliary Bishop of the Roman Catholic Diocese of Kamyanets-Podilskyi and Titular Bishop of Gypsaria. On February 9, 2013, he was consecrated as bishop by Bishop Leon Dubrawski and other prelates of the Roman Catholic Church.

2022 Russian invasion of Ukraine
The bishop's diocese was largely unaffected by the direct impact of the 2022 Russian invasion of Ukraine, but saw a large influx of refugees, to whom the Church provided aid and humanitarian assistance. 

In an interview with Aid to the Church in Need, Bishop Zmitrowicz warned about the lasting effects of the conflict. "The worst consequences of the war will not be immediate, but will drag out. The psychological, spiritual, physical and humanitarian consequences, as well as those on the family, will probably be felt later. The healing is a process. We have started psychological services in one of our houses, and a priest takes part in this process. Only God can heal these deep wounds. Only God can answer the question of why are we suffering in this way." He told the organisation that the Catholic Church had already asked for help from international specialists on PTSD to prepare programmes to help soldiers and their families in the long-run.

References

1962 births
Living people
Clergy from Gdańsk
Missionary Oblates of Mary Immaculate
Adam Mickiewicz University in Poznań alumni
Polish expatriates in Ukraine
21st-century Roman Catholic bishops in Ukraine